David Lewis (born June 8, 1961 in Portland, Oregon) is a former professional American football tight end who played four seasons for the Detroit Lions and the Miami Dolphins. He played tight end for the University of California, Berkeley for three seasons.

Playing career
He was selected by the Lions as their first pick (20th overall) in the 1984 NFL Draft. The Lions cut him before the start of the 1987 season, and he was signed by the Miami Dolphins one month later as a replacement player. He was one of the last replacement players to be cut from the roster once the veteran players returned from the 1987 NFL player's strike, and was re-signed by the Dolphins in December.

References

1961 births
Living people
American football tight ends
California Golden Bears football players
Detroit Lions players
Miami Dolphins players
Players of American football from Portland, Oregon
National Football League replacement players